WACC-LP (107.7 FM) is a radio station broadcasting an alternative rock music format. They break from the format every night with different formats every night. Licensed to Enfield, Connecticut, United States. WACC was one of the first LPFM stations in the state of Connecticut and operates 24 hours a day with a 100-watt ERP signal. The transmitter is located at the Enfield Fire Department. Despite its low power the signal can be heard as far north as Northampton, Massachusetts and as far south as Farmington, Connecticut. The station is currently owned by Asnuntuck Community College.

The long-time operations manager is WKCI-FM and WKSS's Adam Rivers.

References

External links
 107-7 WACC Online

ACC-LP
ACC-LP
Radio stations established in 2001
2001 establishments in Connecticut